Admiralty courts, also known as maritime courts, are courts exercising jurisdiction over all maritime contracts, torts, injuries, and offences.

Admiralty courts in the United Kingdom

England and Wales

Scotland

The Scottish court's earliest records, held in West Register House in Edinburgh, indicate that sittings were a regular event by at least 1556. Judges were styled "Judge Admiral" and received appointment at the hands of the Scottish High Admiral to hear matters affecting the Royal Scots Navy as well as mercantile, privateering and prize money disputes. From 1702 the judge of the court was also authorised to appoint deputies to hear lesser matters or to deputise during his absence.

The Scottish court's workload was small until the mid-eighteenth century, with judges hearing no more than four matters in each sitting. After the 1750s the volume of cases rose until by 1790 it was necessary to maintain a daily log of decisions. The growth in caseload was related to increasing disputes regarding breaches of charter, including ship's masters seeking compensation for unpaid freight and merchants suing for damage to goods or unexpected port fees. Cases reflected Scotland's principal marine industries including the transshipment of sugar and tobacco and the export of dried fish, coal and grains. A smaller number of cases related to smuggling, principally brandy, and to salvage rights for ships wrecked on Scottish shores. The court ceased operation in 1832 and its functions were subsumed into the Court of Session, Scotland's supreme court for civil disputes.

Cinque Ports
The sole survivor of the independent courts of admiralty is the Court of Admiralty for the Cinque Ports, which is presided over by the early-merged role of Judge Official and Commissary. This office is normally held by a High Court Judge who holds the appointment of Admiralty Judge. The jurisdiction of the Court of Admiralty of the Cinque Ports extends in an area with boundaries running from the Naze Tower, Essex along the shore to Brightlingsea, then to Shoe Beacon (or Shore Beacon), (to the east of Shoeburyness, Essex), across the mouth of the Thames Estuary to Shellness, Kent, and around the coast to Redcliffe, near Seaford, Sussex. It covers all the sea from Seaford to a point five miles off Cape Grisnez on the coast of France, and the Galloper Sands off the coast of Essex. The last full sitting was in 1914. According to general civilian practice, the registrar can (and here does) act as deputy to the judge. Unless the judge finds a conflict of interest in the registrar's work their main task is to co-invest each successive Lord Warden of the Cinque Ports. Appeal from the court's decisions lies to the Judicial Committee of the Privy Council.

Court regalia

Since Elizabethan times, the symbol of authority for a British admiralty court has been a silver oar, placed before the judge when the court is in session. In this respect the silver oar is the equivalent of a ceremonial mace, representing the authority of the Crown and the Lord High Admiral of the United Kingdom. An antique silver oar is still placed before the bench when the High Court sits in London on matters relating to its admiralty court functions; in past times it was borne by the marshal in procession, not only in court but on occasions of arrest of persons or vessels, and also on the way to Execution Dock for the last journey of those convicted of piracy. The date of the London oar is uncertain: it is depicted on the tomb of David Lewis, Judge of the High Court of Admiralty from 1559 until 1584, there is some evidence that it may date from the beginnings of the court in the fourteenth century, though one of several assay marks suggests that it was remade three centuries later (based on the earlier pattern). Local courts and vice-admiralty courts had their own silver oars; early examples survive from colonial courts in Bermuda (1701), Boston (1725), New York City (c. 1725), Colombo (1801), Cape of Good Hope (1806) and Calcutta.

The Admiralty Court of the Cinque Ports had a silver oar of early date, but it was stolen in the 1960s and replaced with a replica. Some local authorities possess examples relating to their former local admiralty jurisdiction. In recent times, new silver oars have been made for admiralty courts in Canada, Australia and New Zealand; in 2014 the Admiralty Court presented a replica silver oar mace to the Corporation of Trinity House on the occasion of its 500th anniversary, acknowledging the work of its brethren in advising the court over much of its history.

In addition to representing the Court in session, from the nineteenth century the silver oar has been the insignia of the Admiralty Marshal - an official responsible for serving writs of the Court, and carrying out the sale of any vessels seized and disposed of by Court decision.

Vice admiralty courts
To expedite the administration of maritime law, British colonies were routinely granted subsidiary jurisdiction through independent vice-admiralty courts. These were civil courts with the power to interpret colonial legislation, provided these did not conflict with Admiralty Court decisions or British maritime law.

The first vice-admiralty court in Australia was established in the colony of New South Wales in 1788. The first Vice-Admiral was Arthur Phillip and the first judge was Robert Ross. The court was abolished in 1911 when the Supreme Court of New South Wales was granted the admiralty jurisdiction of the court.

A vice-admiralty court was also formed in Nova Scotia to try smugglers and to enforce the Sugar Act of 1764 throughout British North America. From 1763 to 1765, when American smugglers were caught, they were tried by corrupt judges who received a percentage of the confiscated goods if the defendants were found guilty; therefore, defendants were more than likely to be found guilty.

Colonial courts of admiralty
1890 saw the enactment of the Colonial Courts of Admiralty Act 1890 (UK).  That Act provided for the abolition of the imperial courts of admiralty and replace them with local courts to be called colonial courts of admiralty. It was widely considered unsatisfactory that the imperial court should exist separately to the colonial courts, yet use the same facilities and personnel of the colonial courts.

Ceylon
A colonial court of admiralty was established in the British Ceylon in 1891 under the Ceylon Courts of Admiralty Ordinance under the provisions of the Colonial Courts of Admiralty Act 1890 (UK) to deal jurisdiction over all admiralty and maritime actions. With Ceylon gaining self rule in 1948, jurisdiction over admiralty matters were transferred to the Supreme Court of Ceylon as the Ceylon Independence Act 1947 (UK) made provisions of the Admiralty Act inapplicable.

In Sri Lanka today, admiralty jurisdiction is exercised by the High Court of Colombo, having had the jurisdiction transferred to it from the Supreme Court under the provisions of the Judicature Act No.2 of 1978.

Admiralty courts in the United States
In the United States, the federal district courts have jurisdiction over all admiralty and maritime actions; see .

In recent years, a pseudolegal conspiracy argument used notably by sovereign citizens is that an American court displaying an American flag with a gold fringe is in fact an "admiralty court" and thus has no jurisdiction. Courts have repeatedly dismissed this as frivolous. In United States v. Greenstreet, the court summarized their finding to this argument with, "Unfortunately for Defendant Greenstreet, decor is not a determinant for jurisdiction."

Notes

References

Bibliography

Admiralty law
Courts by type